William Laws Calley Jr. (born June 8, 1943) is a former United States Army officer and war criminal convicted by court-martial for the murder of 22 unarmed South Vietnamese civilians in the Mỹ Lai massacre on March 16, 1968, during the Vietnam War. Calley was released to house arrest under orders by President Richard Nixon three days after his conviction. A new trial was ordered by the United States Court of Appeals for the Fifth Circuit but that ruling was overturned by the Supreme Court. Calley served three years of house arrest for the murders. Public opinion about Calley was divided.

Early life and education 
Calley was born in Miami, Florida. His father, William Laws Calley Sr., was a United States Navy veteran of World War II. Calley Jr. graduated from Miami Edison High School in Miami and then attended Palm Beach Junior College in 1963. He dropped out in 1964.

Calley then had a variety of jobs before enlistment, including as a bellhop, dishwasher, salesman, insurance appraiser, and train conductor.

Career 
Calley underwent eight weeks of basic combat training at Fort Bliss, Texas, followed by eight weeks of advanced individual training as a company clerk at Fort Lewis, Washington. Having scored high enough on his Armed Forces Qualification tests, he applied for and was accepted into Officer Candidate School (OCS).

He then began 26 weeks of junior officer training at Fort Benning in mid-March 1967. Upon graduating from OCS Class No. 51 on September 7, 1967, he was commissioned a second lieutenant in the infantry. He was assigned to 1st Platoon, Company C, 1st Battalion, 20th Infantry Regiment, 11th Infantry Brigade, 23rd Infantry Division "The Americal Division" , and began training at Schofield Barracks, Hawaii, in preparation for deployment to South Vietnam.

Calley's evaluations described him as average as an officer. Later, as the My Lai investigation progressed, a more negative picture emerged. Men in his platoon reported to Army investigators that Calley lacked common sense and could not read a map or compass properly.

In May or June 1969 near Chu Lai Base Area, Calley and two other Americal Division officers were in a jeep that passed a jeep containing five Marines. The Army jeep pulled the Marines over and one Army officer told the Marines "You soldiers better square away!" One of the Marines replied, "We ain't soldiers, motherfucker, we're Marines!" The Army lieutenants dismounted for further discussion of the matter. The ensuing fight ended only after one of the officers pulled his pistol and fired a round into the air. Two of the officers were briefly hospitalized while Calley was merely beaten up. The Marines pled guilty at special courts-martial, in each of which it was stipulated they had not known the soldiers had been officers.

Mỹ Lai Massacre 

In March of 1968 Calley and his men arrived at the village of Mỹ Lai where they murdered hundreds of elderly men, women, children, and infants from allied South Vietnam. In addition, he and his men gang-raped many of the women, some as young as 12 years old, before mutilating them, even stopping to have lunch before resuming their slaughter. Calley would later claim in court that an air strike had killed the innocent civilians. There was no sign of enemy combatants in Mỹ Lai when he and his men arrived.

Murder trial 

The events in My Lai were initially covered up by the U.S. Army. In April 1969, nearly 13 months after the massacre, Ron Ridenhour, a GI who had been with the 11th Brigade, wrote letters to the President, Chairman of the Joint Chiefs of Staff, the Secretary of Defense and 30 members of Congress. In these letters, Ridenhour described some of the atrocities committed by the soldiers at My Lai that he had been told about.

Calley was charged on September 5, 1969, with six specifications of premeditated murder for the deaths of 109 South Vietnamese civilians near the village of Sơn Mỹ, at a hamlet called Mỹ Lai, called simply "My Lai" in the United States press. As many as 500 villagers – mostly women, children, infants, and the elderly – had been systematically killed by U.S. soldiers during a bloody rampage on March 16, 1968. Upon conviction, Calley could have faced the death penalty. On November 12, 1969, investigative reporters Seymour Hersh and Wayne Greenhaw broke the story and revealed that Calley had been charged with murdering 109 South Vietnamese.

Calley's trial started on November 17, 1970. It was the military prosecution's contention that Calley, in defiance of the rules of engagement, ordered his men to deliberately murder unarmed Vietnamese civilians, even though his men were not under enemy fire at all. Testimony revealed that Calley had ordered the men of 1st Platoon, Company C, 1st Battalion, 20th Infantry of the 23rd Infantry Division to kill everyone in the village.

In presenting the case, the two military prosecutors, Aubrey M. Daniel III and John Partin, were hamstrung by the reluctance of many soldiers to testify against Calley. In addition, President Richard M. Nixon made public statements prior to the trial that were prejudicial to the defense, resulting in a letter from Daniel taking the President to task. Some soldiers refused to answer questions point-blank on the witness stand by citing the Fifth Amendment right against self-incrimination.

One holdout, Private First Class Paul David Meadlo, having been granted immunity, was ordered by Judge Reid W. Kennedy to testify or face contempt of court charges. Meadlo thus took the stand and recounted that as he stood guard over some 30 villagers whom he, along with Private Dennis Conti, had gathered at a defoliated area at the hamlet's southern tip, he was approached by Calley and told, regarding the civilians, "You know what to do with 'em". Meadlo took that as orders to only keep watch over them. Calley, however, returned 10 minutes later and became enraged by the fact that the villagers were still alive. After telling Meadlo that he had wanted them dead, Calley backed up about 20 feet, opened fire on them himself and ordered Meadlo to join in, which he did. Meadlo then proceeded to round up more villagers to be massacred.

Conti's testimony corroborated that given by Meadlo, and laid the blame on Calley not only for the initiation of the massacre but also for the participation in it by his subordinates. Another witness, Leonard Gonzalez, told of finding seven women, all naked, all dead, killed by several  M-79 grenade launcher rounds.

Calley's original defense, that the death of the villagers was the result of an accidental airstrike, was overcome by prosecution witnesses. In his new defense, Calley claimed he was following the orders of his immediate superior, Captain Ernest Medina. Whether this order was actually given is disputed; Medina was acquitted of all charges relating to the incident at a separate trial in August 1971.

Taking the witness stand, Calley, under the direct examination by his civilian defense lawyer George W. Latimer, claimed that on the previous day, his commanding officer, Captain Medina, made it clear that his unit was to move into the village and that everyone was to be shot, saying that they all were Viet Cong. Medina publicly denied that he had ever given such orders and stated that he had meant enemy soldiers, while Calley assumed that his order to "kill the enemy" meant to kill everyone. On direct examination during his court martial, Calley stated:

The prosecution called over 100 witnesses to testify against Calley during the trial. After President Nixon intervened in the trial, the assistant prosecutor, Captain Partin, wrote a letter to the White House saying that the presidential intervention had "degraded" and "defiled" the military justice system.

After deliberating for 79 hours, the six-officer jury (five of whom had served in Vietnam) convicted him on March 29, 1971, of the premeditated murder of 22 South Vietnamese civilians. On March 31, 1971, Calley was sentenced to life imprisonment with hard labor at Fort Leavenworth, which includes the United States Disciplinary Barracks, the Department of Defense's only maximum security prison. Calley was the only one convicted of the 26 officers and soldiers initially charged for their part in the Mỹ Lai massacre or the subsequent cover-up. Many observers saw My Lai as a direct result of the military's attrition strategy with its emphasis on body counts and kill ratios.

Many in the United States were outraged by what they perceived to be an overly harsh sentence for Calley. Georgia's Governor, Jimmy Carter, future President of the United States, instituted American Fighting Man's Day, and asked Georgians to drive for a week with their lights on. Indiana's Governor Edgar Whitcomb asked that all state flags be flown at half-staff for Calley, and the governors of Utah and Mississippi also publicly disagreed with the verdict. The legislatures of Arkansas, Kansas, Texas, New Jersey, and South Carolina requested clemency for Calley. Alabama's governor, George Wallace, visited Calley in the stockade and requested that President Richard Nixon pardon him. After the conviction, the White House received over 5,000 telegrams; the ratio was 100 to 1 in favor of leniency. In a telephone survey of the U.S. public, 79 percent disagreed with the verdict, 81 percent believed that the life sentence Calley had received was too stern, and 69 percent believed Calley had been made a scapegoat.

Nixon received so many telegrams  from Americans requesting clemency or a pardon for William Calley that he remarked to Henry Kissinger, "Most people don't give a shit whether he killed them or not."

In a recollection on the Vietnam War, South Korea's "Vietnam Expeditionary Forces" commander Chae Myung-shin stated that "Calley tried to get revenge for the deaths of his troops. In a war, this is natural." Conversely, Colonel Harry G. Summers Jr. declared that Calley and Medina should have been hanged, drawn, and quartered, with their remains placed "at the gates of Fort Benning, at the Infantry School, as a reminder to those who pass under it of what an infantry officer ought to be."

Appeals
Three days after Calley's conviction, President Richard Nixon ordered Calley removed from prison and placed under house arrest at Fort Benning. On August 20, 1971, Lt. Gen. Albert O. Connor, Commanding General of Third Army, in his capacity as the convening authority, reduced Calley's sentence to 20 years in prison. As required by law, his conviction and sentence were reviewed and sustained by the United States Army Court of Military Review, and the United States Court of Military Appeals.

Calley appealed his conviction to the United States District Court for the Middle District of Georgia. On February 27, 1974, Judge J. Robert Elliott granted a writ of habeas corpus and set Calley free on bail. The court held that Calley had been improperly convicted due to extensive pre-trial publicity, the military court's refusal to permit certain defense witnesses, the refusal of the United States House of Representatives to release testimony about the My Lai massacre taken in executive session, and inadequate notice of charges. As the Army appealed Judge Elliott's decision, Secretary of the Army Howard H. Callaway reviewed Calley's conviction and sentence as required by law. After reviewing the conclusions of the court-martial, Court of Military Review, and Court of Military Appeals, Callaway reduced Calley's sentence to just 10 years. Under military regulations, a prisoner is eligible for parole after serving one-third of their sentence. This made Calley eligible for parole after serving three years and four months.

A three-judge panel of the United States Court of Appeals for the Fifth Circuit reversed the district court's ruling and returned Calley to custody on June 13, 1974. Calley once more appealed his conviction to Judge Elliott. He asked the Circuit Justice of the Fifth Circuit, Lewis F. Powell Jr., to set him free on bail while his appeal was pending, but Justice Powell denied the request.

The district court once more found the pre-trial publicity, the denial of defense witnesses, and improperly drawn charges had denied Calley a fair trial, and ordered him released on September 25, 1974. Calley was released on bail while the government appealed the ruling. The Fifth Circuit Court of Appeals heard the Army's latest appeal en banc. The full court ruled 8-to-5 to overturn the district court, and ordered Calley's conviction and sentence reinstated on September 10, 1975. Because Calley had less than 10 days to serve before his possible parole, and because Army Secretary Callaway had expressed his intention to parole Calley as soon as possible, the Army refused to incarcerate Calley for the remaining 10 days of his sentence.

Calley appealed the Fifth Circuit's ruling to the U.S. Supreme Court, but it declined to hear his case on April 5, 1976.

After release 
On May 15, 1976, Calley married Penny Vick, the daughter of a Columbus, Georgia, jewelry store owner. Judge J. Robert Elliott attended the wedding. The couple had one son and divorced in 2005 or 2006. Calley worked at his father-in-law's store and became a gemologist and obtained his real estate license, which had initially been denied due to his prior criminal record. During his divorce, Calley claimed to be suffering from prostate cancer and gastrointestinal problems leaving him with no chance of earning a living.

On August 19, 2009, while speaking to the Kiwanis Club of Greater Columbus, Calley issued an apology for his role in the Mỹ Lai massacre. Calley said:

There is not a day that goes by that I do not feel remorse for what happened that day in Mỹ Lai. I feel remorse for the Vietnamese who were killed, for their families, for the American soldiers involved and their families. I am very sorry.

As of 2018, he was living in Gainesville, Florida.

See also 
 Glenn Andreotta, Lawrence Colburn, and Hugh Thompson Jr. – U.S. helicopter crew members who intervened to stop the My Lai killings
 Samuel W. Koster – commanding officer of the Americal Division
 John W. Donaldson – later commander of the 11th Infantry Brigade who in 1971 was accused and acquitted of killing 6 Vietnamese civilians in 1968/9
 Terry Nelson – one-hit wonder who released "The Battle Hymn of Lt. Calley" (1971), a song about Calley
 Robert Bales – former United States Army soldier who murdered 16 innocent Afghan civilians and was sentenced to life in prison without parole
 Superior orders – the practice of pleading not guilty, by means of "following orders"

References

External links 
 Hugh Thompson Foundation web site: 501(c)(3) nonprofit founded by Lawrence Colburn in honor of Hugh Thompson
 Famous American Trials: The My Lai Courts-Martial 1970
 Beidler, Philip D., "Calley's Ghost", Virginia Quarterly Review, Winter 2003.
 BBC.co.uk | 29 | 1971: Calley guilty of My Lai Massacre
 The Issue With Alfred as Lt. Calley Was Not A Mad Magazine ... – Doug Gilford's Mad Cover Site

1943 births
Living people
American mass murderers
American people convicted of murder
American people convicted of war crimes
United States Army personnel of the Vietnam War
Criminals from Florida
Military personnel from Florida
People convicted of murder by the United States military
People from Columbus, Georgia
People from Miami
Prisoners sentenced to life imprisonment by the United States military
United States Army officers
United States Army personnel who were court-martialed
Palm Beach State College alumni
Recipients of American presidential clemency